Fomumbod is a surname. Notable people with the surname include:

 Anne Stella Fomumbod, Cameroonian women's rights activist
 Eugene Fomumbod (born 1985), Cameroonian footballer